Blank2y (stylized in all caps) is a South Korean boy band formed by Keystone Entertainment. The group currently consists of eight members: DK, Louis, Donghyuk, Siwoo, Mikey, U, Sungjun, and Sodam. The group made their official debut on May 24, 2022, with their first EP titled K2Y I : Confidence [Thumbs Up]. Originally as nine, Youngbin was removed from the group on February 25, 2023.

History

Pre-debut
Prior to the group's debut, Louis became a contestant in Under Nineteen under his birth name Kim Tae-woo and became a member of the debut lineup, finishing in 3rd place respectively. He debuted as a member of 1the9 on April 13, 2019, and officially disbanded as a group on August 8, 2020.

Donghyuk became a member of a seven member boy group ENOi under the stage name Avin. He made his debuted on April 19, 2019, with "Bloom". However, the group disbanded on January 22, 2021.

Siwoo became a contestant on Produce X 101 under his birth name Park Jin-yeol. However, he was eliminated in the first round ranking 81st. However, he joined The Wild Idol, which was aired from September 17, 2021, until December 16, 2021. Unfortunately, he was eliminated in the third episode and was unable to make it further in the show.

Mikey, under his real name Daisuke Morisaki participated in Produce 101 Japan 2. He was eliminated and ranked 68th upon episode 0, thus being unable to actually compete on the show.

Youngbin was a former contestant on Mnet's survival show I-Land. He was eliminated in the first part.

Sungjun was a former Woollim Entertainment trainee and was part of W Project 4. They released a single on September 2, 2019.

2022: Debut with K2Y I : Confidence [Thumbs Up] and K2Y II : Passion [Fuego] 
On May 6, the group announced their first mini album K2Y I : Confidence [Thumbs Up], which was released on May 24.

On August 2, the group announced their first comeback, with the mini album K2Y II : Passion [Fuego], which was released on August 24.

2023: Youngbin's departure 
On February 25, 2023, an anonymous individual came forward accusing idol "Y" of dating violence, who was later confirmed to be Youngbin. Later that day, Keystone Entertainment confirmed the rumors, and announced that Youngbin had left Blank2y and the group will reorganize as eight members.

Members

Current
 DK (닥)
 Louis (루이)
 Donghyuk (동혁)
 Siwoo (시우)
 Mikey (마이키)
 U (유)
 Sungjun (성준)
 Sodam (소담)

Former
 Youngbin (영빈)

Discography

Extended plays

Singles

Ambassadorship 
 Honorary Ambassador to Promote Tourism in Korea and Vietnam (2022)

References

External links
  

2022 establishments in South Korea
Musical groups from Seoul
K-pop music groups
Musical groups established in 2022
South Korean dance music groups
South Korean boy bands